The Lublin Triangle is a regional alliance of three European countriesLithuania, Poland, and Ukrainefor the purposes of strengthening mutual military, cultural, economic and political cooperation and supporting Ukraine's integration into the European Union and NATO. The Lublin Triangle initiative invokes the integrative heritage of the 1569 Union of Lublin.
 
The Lublin Triangle countries declare their support for restoring Ukraine's territorial integrity within internationally recognized borders and call for an end to Russian aggression against Ukraine. The Lublin Triangle supports granting Ukraine the status of NATO enhanced partner and considers a NATO Membership Action Plan for Ukraine to be the next necessary step in that direction.

The tripartite format draws on the traditions and historic ties of the three countries. The pertinent joint declaration was adopted by the several ministers on 28 July 2020 in Lublin, Poland. Lublin was chosen in deliberate reference to the 1569 Union of Lublin that created the Polish–Lithuanian Commonwealth, then one of the largest countries in Europe.

History 
A joint declaration by the Foreign Ministers of Lithuania, Poland and Ukraine, Linas Linkevičius, Jacek Czaputowicz and Dmytro Kuleba, on the creation of the format was signed on July 28, 2020, in Lublin, Poland.

On August 1, 2020, the Minister for Foreign Affairs of Ukraine Dmytro Kuleba invited the Minister of Foreign Affairs of Belarus Volodymyr Makei to the second meeting, which is to take place in Kyiv. During the Economic Forum in Karpacz, Poland, on September 10, 2020, Jan Hofmokl, Director of the Eastern Department of the Polish Foreign Ministry, stated that the Lublin Triangle should in fact be a square with Belarus. According to him, at the initial stage Minsk was interested in this political project, but later changed its mind.

On September 17, 2020, the first meeting (in the format of a video conference) of the national coordinators of the Lublin Triangle, created by the Foreign Ministers of Ukraine, Poland and Lithuania in July 2020, took place. Vasyl Bodnar (Ukraine), Marcin Przydacz (Poland) and Dalius Čekuolis (Lithuania), Deputy Foreign Ministers, have been appointed coordinators of this tripartite cooperation mechanism. The parties discussed preparations for the next meeting of the Foreign Ministers of the Lublin Triangle, which is to take place in Kyiv on the initiative of Minister Dmytro Kuleba. One of the main tasks of the Lublin Triangle should be to coordinate the actions of Ukraine, Poland and Lithuania to effectively counter the challenges and threats to common security, among which the priority is to counter hybrid threats from Russia.

On January 29, 2021, during the first online meeting of the Lublin Triangle, Ukrainian Foreign Minister Dmytro Kuleba stated at a briefing that Ukraine, Lithuania and Poland are in favor of Belarus joining the Lublin Triangle, but the time has not yet come.

On March 4, 2021, the President of the Coordination Council of Belarus, Sviatlana Tsikhanouskaya, stated that she had received an invitation from Dmytro Kuleba to a meeting of the Lublin Triangle and was waiting for an invitation to an offline meeting with Kuleba and the Verkhovna Rada. Tsikhanouskaya noted that she wanted the "Lublin Triangle" to become the "Lublin Four".

On October 5, 2021, in the format of a round table within the framework of the Warsaw Security Forum, a meeting of the Foreign Ministers of the Lublin Triangle took place, in particular, Dmitry Kuleba stressed that the Lublin Triangle is a vivid example of a new trend in international politics for the creation of regional alliances:

Dmytro Kuleba stressed that the Lublin Triangle is enshrined in the recently approved Strategy of Ukraine's Foreign Policy as one of the important new international formats of cooperation between Ukraine. Together with the Association Trio, the Quadriga and the Crimea Platform, these new formats reflect Ukraine's new proactive foreign policy and aim to create a zone of security and prosperity for Ukraine and the Baltic and Black Sea region.

On December 2, 2021, the presidents of the Lublin Triangle held the first joint talks and adopted a statement calling on the international community to strengthen sanctions against the Russian Federation due to its ongoing aggression against Ukraine. The heads of state also demanded that the Kremlin withdraw Russian troops from Ukraine's borders and temporarily occupied territories. In a statement, the presidents reaffirmed their commitment to strengthening Europe's energy security and expressed concern over the Nord Stream 2 project. The leaders agreed to work together to counter Russia's attempts to monopolize the European gas market and use energy as a geopolitical weapon. The presidents also expressed mutual support amid the migration crisis on the EU's borders, artificially created by the Lukashenko regime.

On the eve of the large-scale Russian invasion of Ukraine, on February 23, 2022, the heads of states of the Lublin Triangle met in Kyiv, where they signed a joint declaration. It condemns the decision of the Russian Federation to recognize the temporarily occupied territories of Donetsk and Luhansk Oblasts as "independent", and also supports granting Ukraine the status of a candidate for EU membership.

On November 26, 2022, the prime ministers of the Lublin Triangle signed a joint statement based on the results of the meeting within the framework of the "Lublin Triangle" in Kyiv, in which they called on the international community to recognize the common goal of liberating the entire temporarily occupied territory of Ukraine. The document also talks about intensifying the process of negotiations regarding Ukraine's accession to NATO.

On January 11, 2023, the presidents of the states of the Lublin Triangle held a second summit in Lviv and signed a joint declaration. Polish President Andrzej Duda announced that Ukraine will receive a company of Leopard tanks as part of the creation of an international coalition.

Mechanisms of co-operation 

According to this Joint Declaration of Lithuania, Poland and Ukraine, the foreign ministers of the parties should hold regular meetings, in particular in the fields of multilateral activities, and with the participation of selected partners. They will also organize consultations at the level of the leadership of the Ministries of Foreign Affairs of their countries and create positions in these ministries on cooperation issues within the framework of the Lublin Triangle.

During the first videoconference meeting on September 17, 2020, the national coordinators identified the main activities of the Lublin Triangle and agreed to ensure sustainable interaction of the format at different working levels. During the meeting, they agreed on the basic principles of the Lublin Triangle and outlined plans for cooperation in the near future. One of the main tasks should be to coordinate the actions of the three states to effectively address the current challenges and threats to our common security. Among the priority topics in the cooperation is joint counteraction to hybrid threats from Russia, in particular in the fight against misinformation. The importance of maintaining close cooperation within international organizations was emphasized.

The Deputy Ministers also agreed to launch tripartite thematic consultations at the level of directors of the foreign ministries of the three countries. The coordinators paid important attention to the situation in Belarus and some other countries in the region. Vasyl Bodnar expressed his gratitude to the partners for their constant support for the territorial integrity and sovereignty of our state and support in counteracting Russian aggression. He also informed his colleagues about the main goals of the Crimean Platform and invited Poland and Lithuania to actively cooperate within the framework of the platform, which aims to deoccupy Crimea.

On October 12, 2020, the Prime Minister of Ukraine Denis Shmygal noted the importance of the newly created "Lublin Triangle" and invited Polish President Andrzej Duda to expand its format, namely to discuss the possibility of meeting of heads of government in the "Lublin Triangle" format during his visit to Ukraine.

On February 27, 2021, Lithuanian Foreign Minister Gabrielius Landsbergis told Ukrainian Radio Liberty that the Lublin Triangle initiative, which unites Ukraine, Lithuania and Poland, brings Ukraine closer to European integration:

He also believes that the Crimean Platform initiative is "extremely useful not only for finding concrete solutions, but also to remind about the problem of the occupation of Crimea."

On December 2, 2021, Deputy Minister for Foreign Affairs of Ukraine Mykola Tochytskyi stated that although Ukraine and Poland demonstrate a high level of strategic partnership, Kyiv and Warsaw plan to further actively develop the Lublin Triangle. According to Tochytskyi, during the political consultations in Warsaw, the parties discussed a wide range of issues, including a complex history.

Initiatives

Interparliamentary Assembly 
The Interparliamentary Assembly of the Verkhovna Rada of Ukraine, the Sejm and the Senate of the Republic of Poland and the Seimas of the Republic of Lithuania were established in 2005 to establish a dialogue between the three countries in the parliamentary dimension. The inaugural meeting of the Assembly took place on June 16, 2008, in Kyiv, Ukraine. Within the framework of the Assembly there are committees on European and Euro-Atlantic integration of Ukraine, humanitarian and cultural cooperation.

Lithuanian–Polish–Ukrainian Brigade

Lithuanian–Polish–Ukrainian Brigade is a multinational unit with capabilities of a general military brigade, designed for conducting independent military operations in accordance with international law or participating in such actions. It is composed of the three countries’ special military units selected from the 21st Podhale Rifleman Brigade (Poland), the 80th Airborne Assault Brigade (Ukraine), and the Grand Duchess Birute Uhlan Battalion (Lithuania).

Since 2016, LITPOLUKRBRIG has been an important element of NATO actions aimed at implementing NATO standards in Armed Forces of Ukraine. The brigade's main activities include training Ukrainian officers and military units in these standards, planning and conducting operational tasks, and maintaining operational readiness.

Youth Lublin Triangle 

The Youth Lublin Triangle is an institutionalised platform for cooperation between the youth of Lithuania, Poland, and Ukraine. Initiated by the youth NGO Public Diplomacy Platform, the Youth Lublin Triangle has already received support from the Ministries of Foreign Affairs of Lithuania, Poland, and Ukraine.

The initiative is inspired by the study of the potential of youth cooperation under the auspices of the Lublin Triangle conducted by the Public Diplomacy Platform and funded by the Konrad Adenauer Stiftung.

The groundwork for the project was laid at the online forum held on 9–10 April 2021. The forum featured representatives of the youth councils of Lithuania, Ukraine, Poland, and Belarus, as well high-profile officials from Lithuania and Ukraine.

Based on close historical and cultural ties between the member states, the Youth Lublin Triangle has been created to ensure synergy between young people and prepare them for life in a prosperous and safe single European space. The areas of cooperation will include, among others, historical and cultural dialogue as well as professional and academic development.

Country comparison

See also 
 Accession of Ukraine to the European Union
 Association Trio
 Community of Democratic Choice
 GUAM Organization for Democracy and Economic Development
 Intermarium
 Intermarium (region)
 Polish–Lithuanian–Ruthenian Commonwealth
 Post-Soviet states
 Three Seas Initiative
 Visegrád Group

References

Lublin Triangle
International military organizations
Economy of Poland
Economy of Lithuania
Economy of Ukraine
Military alliances
Intergovernmental organizations
Foreign relations of Ukraine
Foreign relations of Lithuania
Foreign relations of Poland
Lithuania–Poland relations
Poland–Ukraine relations
Lithuania–Ukraine relations
2020 in Europe
21st-century military alliances
European integration
International political organizations
Intermarium
2020 in the European Union
2020 treaties